Steniodes mendica is a moth in the family Crambidae. It was described by W. von Hedemann in 1894. It is found in Cuba, Jamaica, Puerto Rico, the Virgin Islands and Grenada, Costa Rica, Honduras, Mexico and the United States, where it has been recorded from Florida to Texas.

The wingspan is 12–13 mm. Adults are on wing year round.

References

Moths described in 1894
Spilomelinae